Rutledge Township is one of thirteen townships in DeWitt County, Illinois, USA.  As of the 2010 census, its population was 177 and it contained 64 housing units.  Rutledge Township changed its name from Douglas Township on June 7, 1859.

Geography

Cemeteries
The township contains the Johnson Cemetery.

School districts
 Blue Ridge Community Unit School District 18
 Clinton Community Unit School District 15
 Le Roy Community Unit School District 2

Political districts
 Illinois's 15th congressional district
 State House District 87
 State Senate District 44

References
 
 United States Census Bureau 2009 TIGER/Line Shapefiles
 United States National Atlas

External links
 City-Data.com
 Illinois State Archives
 Township Officials of Illinois

Townships in DeWitt County, Illinois
1858 establishments in Illinois
Populated places established in 1858
Townships in Illinois